Michele Aparecida Ferreira (born 18 November 1984) is a Brazilian former Paralympic judoka who competed at international judo competitions. She is a two-time Paralympic bronze medalist and two-time Parapan American Games champion.

References

1984 births
Living people
Paralympic judoka of Brazil
Brazilian female judoka
Judoka at the 2008 Summer Paralympics
Judoka at the 2012 Summer Paralympics
Judoka at the 2016 Summer Paralympics
Medalists at the 2008 Summer Paralympics
Medalists at the 2012 Summer Paralympics
Medalists at the 2011 Parapan American Games
Medalists at the 2015 Parapan American Games
People from Campo Grande
Sportspeople from Mato Grosso do Sul
20th-century Brazilian women
21st-century Brazilian women